South Solon is a village in Madison County, Ohio, United States. The population was 355 at the 2010 census. Despite their similar names, South Solon is not adjacent to the city of Solon, Ohio, a suburb of Cleveland in Cuyahoga County.

History

As of 1875, the community contained a post office, one grocery store, and one blacksmith shop.  The village's community building was constructed in 1938 by the Public Works Administration at an estimated cost of $25,454.

Geography
South Solon is located at  (39.737861, -83.611277).

Demographics

2010 census
As of the census of 2010, there were 355 people, 123 households, and 94 families living in the village. The racial makeup of the village was 96.9% White, 0.3% African American, 0.3% Native American, and 2.5% from two or more races. Hispanic or Latino of any race were 2.5% of the population.

There were 123 households, of which 38.2% had children under the age of 18 living with them, 56.9% were married couples living together, 11.4% had a female householder with no husband present, 8.1% had a male householder with no wife present, and 23.6% were non-families. 17.1% of all households were made up of individuals, and 6.5% had someone living alone who was 65 years of age or older. The average household size was 2.89 and the average family size was 3.18.

The median age in the village was 37.5 years. 24.5% of residents were under the age of 18; 11.1% were between the ages of 18 and 24; 27.4% were from 25 to 44; 26% were from 45 to 64; and 11.3% were 65 years of age or older. The gender makeup of the village was 50.7% male and 49.3% female.

2000 census
As of the census of 2000, there were 405 people, 141 households, and 108 families living in the village. The population density was 2,033.3 people per square mile (781.9/km). There were 152 housing units at an average density of 763.1 per square mile (293.4/km). The racial makeup of the village was 99.01% White, 0.25% Native American, 0.49% Asian, and 0.25% from two or more races. Hispanic or Latino of any race were 0.99% of the population.

There were 141 households, out of which 40.4% had children under the age of 18 living with them, 56.0% were married couples living together, 11.3% had a female householder with no husband present, and 22.7% were non-families. 16.3% of all households were made up of individuals, and 9.9% had someone living alone who was 65 years of age or older. The average household size was 2.87 and the average family size was 3.25.

In the village, the population was spread out, with 31.4% under the age of 18, 10.6% from 18 to 24, 30.6% from 25 to 44, 17.3% from 45 to 64, and 10.1% who were 65 years of age or older. The median age was 31 years. For every 100 females there were 103.5 males. For every 100 females age 18 and over, there were 101.4 males.

The median income for a household in the village was $34,583, and the median income for a family was $38,750. Males had a median income of $28,456 versus $18,750 for females. The per capita income for the village was $15,152. About 8.4% of families and 10.0% of the population were below the poverty line, including 16.5% of those under age 18 and 3.6% of those age 65 or over.

References

Villages in Madison County, Ohio
Villages in Ohio